Erol Taş (28 February 1928 – 8 November 1998) was a Turkish film actor. He appeared in 220 films between 1957 and 1998. He starred in the 1964 film Susuz Yaz, which won the Golden Bear at the 14th Berlin International Film Festival.

Selected filmography
 Revenge of the Snakes (1962)
 Stranger in the City (1962)
 Susuz Yaz (1964)
 The Hand That Feeds the Dead (1974)
 Lover of the Monster (1974)

References

External links

1928 births
1998 deaths
People from Erzurum
Deaths from diabetes
Turkish male film actors
20th-century Turkish male actors